The gadfly petrels or Pterodroma are a genus of about 35 species of petrels, part of the seabird order Procellariiformes. The gadfly petrels are named for their speedy weaving flight, as if evading gadflies (horseflies). The flight action is also reflected in the name Pterodroma, from Ancient Greek  pteron, "wing" and dromos, "runner".

The short, sturdy bills of these medium to large petrels are adapted for soft prey that they pick from the ocean surface. They have twisted intestines for digesting marine animals that have unusual biochemistries.

Their complex wing and face marking are probably for interspecific recognition.

These birds nest in colonies on islands and are pelagic when not breeding. One white egg is laid usually in a burrow or on open ground. They are nocturnal at the breeding colonies.

While generally wide-ranging, most Pterodroma species are confined to a single ocean basin (e.g. Atlantic), and vagrancy is not as common amongst the genus as in some other seabird species (c.f. the storm petrels Hydrobatidae).

Taxonomy
The genus Pterodroma was introduced in 1856 by the French naturalist Charles Lucien Bonaparte. The genus name combines the Ancient Greek pteron meaning "wing" with dromos  meaning "racer" or "runner". The type species was subsequently designated as the great-winged petrel by the American ornithologist Elliott Coues in 1866.

The species listed here are those recognised in the online list maintained by Frank Gill, Pamela Rasmussen and David Donsker on behalf of the International Ornithological Committee (IOC). The genus includes 35 species, of which one has become possibly extinct in historical times.

 Great-winged petrel, Pterodroma macroptera – Indian and Atlantic Oceans
 White-headed petrel, Pterodroma lessonii – Southern Ocean
 Grey-faced petrel, Pterodroma gouldi – Pacific Ocean
 Atlantic petrel, Pterodroma incerta – south Atlantic Ocean
 Providence petrel, Pterodroma solandri – west Pacific Ocean
 Magenta petrel, Pterodroma magentae – south Pacific Ocean, but poorly known
 Murphy's petrel, Pterodroma ultima – east and central  Pacific Ocean
 Soft-plumaged petrel, Pterodroma mollis – Atlantic Ocean, Indian Ocean and margins of western Pacific Ocean
 Zino's petrel or Madeira petrel, Pterodroma madeira – east Atlantic Ocean
 Fea's petrel, Pterodroma feae – Atlantic Ocean
 Desertas petrel, Pterodroma desertae (disputed) – Atlantic Ocean
 Bermuda petrel, Pterodroma cahow – northwest Atlantic Ocean
 Black-capped petrel, Pterodroma hasitata – Atlantic Ocean: Cuba and Hispaniola to Martinique
 Jamaican petrel, Pterodroma caribbaea (possibly extinct) – Atlantic Ocean: Jamaica
 Juan Fernández petrel, Pterodroma externa – east Pacific Ocean
 Vanuatu petrel or Falla's petrel, Pterodroma occulta – southwest Pacific Ocean
 Kermadec petrel, Pterodroma neglecta – Pacific Ocean with eccentric breeding in the Indian Ocean on the Round Island, Mauritius
 Herald petrel, Pterodroma heraldica – southwest Pacific Ocean – split from P. arminjoniana
 Trindade petrel, Pterodroma arminjoniana – south Atlantic Ocean, with eccentric breeding on the Round Island, Mauritius 
 Henderson petrel, Pterodroma atrata – southeast Pacific Ocean – split from P. arminjoniana
 Phoenix petrel, Pterodroma alba – southwest Pacific Ocean
 Barau's petrel, Pterodroma baraui – southwest Indian Ocean
 Hawaiian petrel, Pterodroma sandwichensis – central Pacific Ocean
 Galápagos petrel, Pterodroma phaeopygia – central Pacific Ocean
 Mottled petrel, Pterodroma inexpectata – Pacific Ocean
 White-necked petrel, Pterodroma cervicalis – west Pacific Ocean
 Black-winged petrel, Pterodroma nigripennis – west Pacific Ocean with eccentric breeding in the Indian Ocean on Round Island, Mauritius
 Chatham petrel, Pterodroma axillaris – southwest Pacific Ocean
 Bonin petrel, Pterodroma hypoleuca – northwest Pacific Ocean
 Gould's petrel, Pterodroma leucoptera – south Pacific Ocean
 Collared petrel, Pterodroma brevipes – southwest Pacific Ocean
 Cook's petrel, Pterodroma cookii – Pacific Ocean
 Masatierra petrel, Pterodroma defilippiana – east Pacific Ocean
 Stejneger's petrel, Pterodroma longirostris – north and east Pacific Ocean
 Pycroft's petrel, Pterodroma pycrofti – southwest Pacific Ocean

See also
 List of gadfly petrels

References

 

Taxa named by Charles Lucien Bonaparte